Jeanne Louise Victoire "Zoë" (1787 – after 1792) was the adopted daughter of King Louis XVI (1754–1793) and Queen Marie-Antoinette (1755–1793) of France.

Life

Early life 

Jeanne Louise Victoire was born in 1787 as the daughter of an usher working in the Maison du Roi, the royal household. She had two older sisters. In 1790, they were orphaned and the queen took on the expenses the children in return for the loyalty of their late parents.

Adoption by the queen 
As Jeanne Louise Victoire was close in age to Prince Louis-Charles (1785–1795), the dauphin (the future King Louis XVIII of France), Marie-Antoinette decided to adopt her and keep her in the royal household as his playmate. She gave a new name to her, Zoë. Her two elder sisters were sent to a convent boarding school on the queen's expense. She was the last child to be adopted by the royal family, after François-Michel "Armand" Gagné (1771–1792), adopted in 1776, Jean Amilcar (1781–1796) adopted in 1787, and Marie-Philippine "Ernestine" Lambriquet (1778–1813), adopted in 1788.  

Zoë was sent away to join her sisters in their boarding school before the Flight to Varennes in 1791.  The expenses of the girls stopped being paid when the queen was imprisoned the following year, but nothing further is known about their fate.

See also 

 Armand Gagné
 Jean Amilcar
 Ernestine Lambriquet

References

1787 births
French adoptees
French courtiers
18th-century French people
18th-century French women
Household of Marie Antoinette
Year of death missing
Children of Louis XVI